Kevin Rose (born 23 November 1960) is a former English footballer who played in the Football League for Hereford United, Bolton Wanderers, Carlisle United and Rochdale as a goalkeeper. He holds the record of most consecutive appearances for Hereford United.

He started his career at hometown club Evesham United before moving to Worcester City. A loss of form and confidence saw Rose lose his place in the Worcester goal and his contract with them was cancelled by mutual consent in February 1979. The following month, Rose signed for Ledbury Town in the process becoming the club's first contracted player. His performances for Ledbury attracted the attention of several league clubs and shortly into the 1979–80 season, he was signed by Lincoln City for £10,000. Ledbury used the fee to erect floodlights at their New Street ground and Rose and Lincoln returned on 12 November 1979 to defeat Ledbury Town 4–1 in the inaugural match under the lights.

Rose failed to make the first team at Lincoln City and in September 1980 his contract was cancelled. After a second spell at Ledbury, and having a potential move to Worcester City rejected, he signed for Hereford United in January 1983. He was first choice keeper at Edgar Street, making 253 consecutive appearances in the mid-1980s although Hereford enjoyed little success in the Fourth Division.

In 1989, he joined Bolton Wanderers but only played 10 league matches in two seasons, and was loaned to Carlisle United and Rochdale. He joined the latter in 1991, and had a goal incorrectly disallowed in a match against Bury. He came up for a corner and his header crossed the line by a couple of yards. Not that it matter as Rochdale scored seconds later with Rose providing the assist.

He finished his career at Kidderminster Harriers and also played for the England semi-professional team.

References

1960 births
Living people
People from Evesham
Association football goalkeepers
English footballers
Evesham United F.C. players
Worcester City F.C. players
Ledbury Town F.C. players
Lincoln City F.C. players
Hereford United F.C. players
Bolton Wanderers F.C. players
Halifax Town A.F.C. players
Carlisle United F.C. players
Rochdale A.F.C. players
Kidderminster Harriers F.C. players
Redditch United F.C. players
English Football League players
England semi-pro international footballers
Sportspeople from Worcestershire